Laurie Winn Carlson (born January 27, 1952) is an American children's storybook author. She currently lives in Cheney, Washington. Carlson believes that medically-explained symptoms from girls involved in the Salem witch trials were later blamed on witches, as the doctor failed to find a medically reasonable cause.

Books

References

1952 births
Living people
20th-century American women writers
American women children's writers
American children's writers
People from Sonora, California
People from Cheney, Washington
21st-century American women